The Arado L II was a 1920s German two-seat, high-wing touring monoplane.

In 1930, a revised version with folding wings and improved undercarriage, the L IIa first flew, and four examples took part in the Challenge International de Tourisme 1930, starting from Berlin-Tempelhof airport, but none placed, and one crashed early in the race.

Specifications (L IIa)
Data from German Aviation 1919 – 1945

Notes

Further reading

 
 
 World Aircraft Information Files. Brightstar Publishing, London. File 889 Sheet 73

Single-engined tractor aircraft
High-wing aircraft
1920s German sport aircraft
L II
Aircraft first flown in 1929